Elbert County is a county located in the U.S. state of Colorado. As of the 2020 census, the population was 26,062. The county seat is Kiowa and the largest town is Elizabeth.

Elbert County is included in the Denver-Aurora-Lakewood, CO Metropolitan Statistical Area.

History
Elbert County was created on February 2, 1874, from the eastern portions of Douglas County. On February 6, 1874, the county was enlarged to include part of northern Greenwood County  upon Greenwood's dissolution, and originally extended south and east of its present boundaries to reach to the Kansas state line. The county was named for Samuel Hitt Elbert, the Governor of the Territory of Colorado when the county was formed. In 1889, Elbert County was reduced to its modern size when its eastern portions were taken to create Lincoln, Kit Carson, and Cheyenne counties.

Geography

Adjacent counties
 Arapahoe County - north
 Lincoln County - east
 El Paso County - south
 Douglas County - west

Major Highways
  Interstate 70

  U.S. Highway 24
  U.S. Highway 40
  U.S. Highway 287
  State Highway 86

Demographics

At the 2000 census there were 19,872 people, 6,770 households, and 5,652 families in the county. The racial makeup of the county was 95.22% White, 0.64% Black or African American, 0.63% Native American, 0.37% Asian, 0.09% Pacific Islander, 1.28% from other races, and 1.76% from two or more races. 3.85% of the population were Hispanic or Latino of any race. Of the 6,770 households 42.80% had children under the age of 18 living with them, 75.10% were married couples living together, 5.70% had a female householder with no husband present, and 16.50% were non-families. 12.20% of households were one person and 3.10% were one person aged 65 or older. The average household size was 2.93 and the average family size was 3.19.

The age distribution was 30.20% under the age of 18, 5.50% from 18 to 24, 32.80% from 25 to 44, 25.50% from 45 to 64, and 6.00% 65 or older. The median age was 37 years. For every 100 females there were 100.60 males. For every 100 females age 18 and over, there were 99.90 males.

The median household income was $62,480 and the median family income was $66,740. Males had a median income of $45,329 versus $29,767 for females. The per capita income for the county was $24,960. About 2.50% of families and 4.00% of the population were below the poverty line, including 4.60% of those under age 18 and 4.50% of those age 65 or over.

Communities

Towns
Elizabeth
Kiowa
Simla

Census-designated places
Elbert
Matheson
Ponderosa Park

Other unincorporated places
Agate
Fondis

Politics
Elbert is a strongly Republican county in Presidential elections. Along with Rio Blanco County and Kit Carson County, it was one of three Colorado counties to be won by Alf Landon in 1936, and stood together with Hinsdale and Washington Counties by supporting Barry Goldwater over Lyndon Johnson in 1964. The last Democratic presidential nominee to carry Elbert County was Franklin Delano Roosevelt in 1932.

Elbert County is in the 4th Congressional District and the current representative is Republican Ken Buck from Windsor.

In senatorial elections, the county has been similarly Republican. No Democratic senatorial candidate has obtained even thirty percent of the county's vote since Ben Nighthorse Campbell, who was later to shift to the Republican Party, in 1992, and none have actually won since before 1990. In gubernatorial elections, Elbert County has also generally been powerfully Republican, but was nonetheless carried by Democrat Roy Romer by a narrow margin in 1990 – when he carried all but four counties statewide – by Dick Lamm in 1982 and by Constitution Party candidate Tom Tancredo in 2010.

The official newspaper of record used by the county is the weekly Elbert County News. The weekly Ranchland News and monthly Prairie Times also cover local events.

See also

Outline of Colorado
Index of Colorado-related articles
Greenwood County, Colorado Territory
National Register of Historic Places listings in Elbert County, Colorado

Notes

External links
 Elbert County Community Homepage

References

 

 
Colorado counties
1874 establishments in Colorado Territory
Eastern Plains
Populated places established in 1874